Franco Scapini (born April 7, 1962) is a former Italian racing driver from Varese.

European racing 
Scapini was passionate about cars and technology from an early age, because he attended his father's workshop, where racing cars were prepared and classic cars were restored. He began to frequent the racetracks with his father and also to have the first experiences with go-karts. After racing go-karts for 3 years, he began his professional career in 1981 in the Italian F.Fiat Abarth Championship, having suffered from a serious accident at Imola. Once recovered from the accident he joined the F2000 Championship immediately getting a fourth and a third place. After these results, the team gave him the opportunity to debut in F3 at Mugello European Formula Three Championship. Without any sponsor's support he participated in partial seasons there until 1983 but always with excellent results, being always among the fastest drivers with a very aggressive but profitable driving. Much appreciated by the team's engineers for his technical skills in the development of the chassis and engines, he moved to Italian Formula Three in 1984 and finished 4th in the series points with 3 wins for the Automotor team. In 1984 he was awarded the coveted Autosprint gold medal (
famous international Motorsport newspaper ) for sporting and competitive merits. Following is successes in 1984, he remained in the same team as well in 1985, spending a large part of the season testing and developing the electronic injection system on the VW Brabham-Judd factory engine and also a system of special air shock absorbers on the flat-bottomed Ralt RT30, devoid of coil springs, but another serious accident put an end to his season. Shortly supported by sponsors he participated in a partial season of Formula 3000 in 1986 with little success. In 1987, he came back to Italian F3 with Automotor, Coloni and Euroteam and also became a test driver for Minardi in F1. In 1988 he made one more Formula 3000 start as well as making his only American Racing Series appearance.  In 1989 he returned to F3000 for 2 more starts and also drove the Mussato Lancia LC2-Ferrari in the World Sport Prototype Championship. In 1990 he signed on as the official test and reserve driver for the Life team in Formula One, however, as the team only had a single chassis, he reportedly only drove in few practice sessions. The Life team and car was a colossal failure and failed to pre-qualify for the first 14 events of the 1990 Formula One season before the team shut down. In 1991 he has the American experience in the IndyCar Championship with the Euromotorsport Lola-Cosworth DFS. Later he decided to prepare a Ferrari F355 for the GT3 category and he did it independently with his own company, the Supertech Racing team. He deserves credit for having brought Ferrari cars back to compete in international GT championships and endurance races such as the 24 Hours of Daytona. And this has probably convinced Ferrari to reconsider the importance of GT racing for sporting customers. At the wheel of the Ferrari F355 GT3 he raced in the French, Spanish and Italian GT Championships, with some good results in the top three and 2 wins, before retiring to become a racing instructor and F1 Powerboat team manager for the D.A.C. Racing team winning 2 European Championships, 8 World Championships and 2 World speed records. He is currently involved in motorsport management and collaborates as a motorsport technical commentator with a major European pay per view network. He also manages a small executive flight company owned by him and he often personally flies planes of this company

American racing 
He made one CART IndyCar World Series start for Euromotorsport in 1991 at Surfers Paradise where he finished a surprising 11th, good enough for 2 points and 28th in series points.  He later competed in two Grand-Am events in 1999 and 2000 driving a Ferrari F355. Both events were the Daytona 24 Hours race. His best finish was 12th in class (1999).

Career results

Complete International Formula 3000 results 
(key) (Races in bold indicate pole position; races in italics indicate fastest lap.)

Complete CART/Indycar results 
(key) (Races in bold indicate pole position)

Complete Indy Lights results 
(key)

Complete 24 Hours of Le Mans results 
Class winners in bold.  Cars failing to complete 70% of the winner's distance marked as Not Classified (NC).

References

 Driver Database profile
 Racing Reference - USA Stats
 Champcar Stats

1962 births
Living people
FIA European Formula 3 Championship drivers
Italian Formula Three Championship drivers
Indy Lights drivers
Champ Car drivers
Rolex Sports Car Series drivers
International Formula 3000 drivers
World Sportscar Championship drivers
EuroInternational drivers